Confessions Illustrated was a black-and-white magazine published by EC Comics in early 1956. Part of EC's Picto-Fiction line, each magazine featured three to five stories. The format alternated blocks of text with several illustrations per page.

The first issue had a cover date of January–February 1956, but the second issue was the last. A third issue existed but was not printed by EC. The Picto-Fiction magazines lost money from the start, and the line was canceled when EC's distributor went bankrupt.

Confessions Illustrated was edited by Al Feldstein. The stories were written by Daniel Keyes. Artists featured include Bud Parke, Jack Kamen, Joe Orlando, Wally Wood, Johnny Craig, Rudy Nappi and Reed Crandall.

In 2006 Confessions Illustrated was reprinted along with the other Picto-Fiction magazines by publisher Russ Cochran (and Gemstone Publishing) in hardbound volumes as the final part of his Complete EC Library. The reprint volume included the previously unpublished third issue of Confessions Illustrated.

Issue guide

References

Visual arts magazines published in the United States
Quarterly magazines published in the United States
Defunct magazines published in the United States
EC Comics publications
Fiction magazines
Magazines established in 1956
Magazines disestablished in 1956
Magazines published in New York City